Richard Joel Dabas Pérez (born 4 August 1994) is a Dominican footballer who plays as a midfielder for Cibao FC in the Liga Dominicana de Fútbol.

He scored the winning goal in the 2017 CFU Club Championship final.

Career statistics

Honours
 Cibao
CFU Club Championship (1): 2017

References

External links

Richard Dabas on LDF

1994 births
Living people
People from Espaillat Province
Dominican Republic footballers
Association football midfielders
Liga Dominicana de Fútbol players
Cibao FC players
Dominican Republic international footballers